Mercedes de Acosta (March 1, 1892 – May 9, 1968) was an American poet, playwright, and novelist. Although she failed to achieve artistic and professional distinction, de Acosta is known for her many lesbian affairs with celebrated Broadway and Hollywood personalities including Alla Nazimova, Isadora Duncan, Eva Le Gallienne, and Marlene Dietrich. Her best-known involvement was with Greta Garbo with whom, in 1931, she began a sporadic and volatile romance. Her 1960 memoir, Here Lies the Heart, is considered part of LGBT history insofar that it hints at the lesbian element in some of her relationships.

Background
She was born in New York City on March 1, 1892. Her father, Ricardo de Acosta, was born in Cuba to Spanish parents, and later emigrated to the United States.  Her mother, Micaela Hernández de Alba y de Alba, was Spanish and allegedly a descendant of the Spanish Dukes of Alba. De Acosta had five siblings: Aida, Ricardo Jr., Angela, Maria, and Rita.  Maria married the socially prominent landscape architect A. Robeson Sargent, son of Harvard botanist Charles Sprague Sargent. Rita became a famous beauty known as Rita Lydig. De Acosta attended elementary 
school at the Convent of the Blessed Sacrament on West 79th Street in Manhattan where Dorothy Parker was a classmate.

De Acosta married painter Abram Poole (January 12, 1882 – May 24, 1961) in 1920. They divorced in 1935.

She was described in 1955 by Garbo biographer, John Bainbridge, as "a woman of courtly manners, impeccable decorative taste and great personal elegance... a woman with a passionate and intense devotion to the art of living... and endowed with a high spirit, energy, eclectic curiosity and a varied interest in the arts."

Personal life

De Acosta was involved in numerous lesbian relationships with Broadway's and Hollywood's elite and she did not attempt to hide her sexuality; her uncloseted existence was very rare and daring in her generation.  In 1916 she began an affair with actress Alla Nazimova and later with dancer Isadora Duncan. Shortly after marrying Abram Poole in 1920, de Acosta became involved in a five-year relationship with actress Eva Le Gallienne. De Acosta wrote two plays for Le Gallienne, Sandro Botticelli and Jehanne de Arc. After the financial failures of both plays they ended their relationship.

Over the next decade she was involved with several famous actresses and dancers including Greta Garbo, Marlene Dietrich, Ona Munson, and Russian ballerina Tamara Platonovna Karsavina. 
Additional unsubstantiated rumors include affairs with Tallulah Bankhead, Pola Negri, Eleonora Duse, Katherine Cornell, and Alice B. Toklas, with an annoyed Bankhead regularly dubbing de Acosta as "Countess Dracula" following their alleged affair.

It has often been said that she once stated, "I can get any woman away from any man," but there is no evidence to substantiate this claim.

An ardent liberal, de Acosta was committed to several political causes. Concerned about the Spanish Civil War, which began in 1936, for example, she supported the Republican government that opposed the Nationalist faction. A tireless advocate for women's rights, she wrote in her memoir, "I believed...in every form of independence for women and I was...an enrolled worker for women's suffrage."

She also became a vegetarian and, out of respect for animals, refused to wear furs.

Relationship with Greta Garbo
De Acosta's best-known relationship was with Greta Garbo. When Garbo's close friend, author Salka Viertel, introduced them in 1931, they quickly became involved. As their relationship developed, it became erratic and volatile with Garbo always in control. The two were very close sporadically and then apart for lengthy periods when Garbo, annoyed by Mercedes' obsessive behavior, coupled with her own neuroses, ignored her. In any case, they remained friends for thirty years during which time Garbo wrote de Acosta 181 letters, cards, and telegrams. About their friendship, Cecil Beaton, who was close to both women, recorded in his 1958 memoir, "Mercedes is [Garbo's] very best friend and for 30 years has stood by her, willing to devote her life to her".

Although it has been argued that an intimate relationship between them cannot be proved, de Acosta states they were lovers. Contrary to legend, she did not do so in her memoir. In 1959, when she was destitute, de Acosta sold her papers to the Rosenbach Museum & Library in Philadelphia and claims to have reluctantly included romantic letters from Garbo. "I would not have had the heart or courage to have burned these letters", she wrote William McCarthy, curator of the museum. "I mean, of course, Eva [sic], Greta's and Marlene's who were lovers.... I only hope... they will be respected and protected from the eyes of vulgar people". All of Garbo's and de Acosta's recent biographers, moreover, discuss their involvement. Per de Acosta's request, Garbo's letters were made available to the public in 2000, ten years after her death, and none were explicitly romantic. However, Garbo's family, which controls her estate, has permitted only 87 of 181 letters to be made public.

Interest in eastern spirituality
In the early 1930s de Acosta developed an interest in Hinduism and was encouraged to seek out Indian mystic Meher Baba when he arrived in Hollywood. For several years she was captivated by his philosophy and methods and he often gave her advice about ways to address her problems. Later, she studied the philosophy of Hindu sage Ramana Maharishi who introduced her to yoga, meditation, and other spiritual practices she hoped would help ease her suffering. In 1938, she met Hindu dancer Ram Gopal in Hollywood. They immediately established a rapport and became close lifelong friends. Later that year they traveled to India to meet Maharishi.

When asked about religion, de Acosta once said that although she had grown up Catholic, she would be, if she had to be anything, a Buddhist.

Later life, controversial autobiography and death
In 1960, when de Acosta was seriously ill with a brain tumor and in need of money, she published her memoir, Here Lies the Heart. The book was well-received by the critics and many close friends praised the book. 
But its implied homosexuality resulted in the severance of several friendships with women who felt she had betrayed their sexuality. Garbo ended their friendship at this time. Eva Le Gallienne in particular was furious, denouncing de Acosta as a liar and stating that she invented the stories for fame. This characterization is inaccurate since many of her affairs and relationships with women, including that with Le Gallienne, are confirmed in personal correspondence.

An exception to this was Marlene Dietrich, who continued to correspond with her and loved the book. According to critic Patricia White, "If she craved being seen, MdA was more careful about what she said than she is given credit for. She wrote a name-dropping memoir, but for something attacked for exaggeration, it barely alludes to homosexuality". In any case, she gained a reputation that was not appreciated by everyone. But as Alice B. Toklas, lover of Gertrude Stein and de Acosta's long-term friend, wrote to a disapproving critic, "Say what you will about Mercedes, she's had the most important women of the twentieth century".

De Acosta died at age 76 in poverty in New York City. She is buried at Trinity Cemetery in Washington Heights, New York City.

Legacy
De Acosta has usually been described disparagingly, dismissed as a "notorious lesbian" who was a dishonest nuisance to her lovers and who consistently "stalked" Garbo. Garbo's biographers, for example, assess their relationship from Garbo's perspective in which Garbo is fundamentally blameless in their difficult relationship, a perpetual victim of de Acosta's alleged irksome behavior. But Robert A. Schanke, de Acosta's recent biographer, attempts, on the basis of extensive research, to provide an accurate picture of her. She was, Schanke acknowledges, flawed and imperfect, a complex woman who impaired several of her relationships and failed to achieve her professional and romantic aspirations. But he reveals her to have been an exceptionally lively, intelligent, and dynamic person who had many devoted friends. She was, he argues, a brave lesbian of her times and a person of integrity who remained kind and loyal to most everyone with whom she crossed paths. He suggests that the many denigrating portrayals of her may derive from the deep homophobia of her generation.

She has been accused of fabricating incidents in her memoir and lacing it with half-truths and fantasies. She herself confessed, "I may have made mistakes in some dates or minor incidents but…I feel I have held to the spirit of my statement if not to the letter". Nevertheless, Karen Swenson, a Garbo biographer, and Schanke identified and corrected significant errors in de Acosta's account. While the memoir was initially unsuccessful, it was rediscovered in the late 1960s and widely read in the underground gay community. In spite of its inaccuracies, it is now recognized as an important contribution to gay and lesbian history.

Her poetic work consists mainly of three books published during her life: Moods (prose poems) (1919), Archways of Life (1921), and Streets and Shadows (1922). A comprehensive compilation of these three books appeared, for the first time, in Spanish translation under the title Imposeída (46 poemas) (Las Cruces, NM: Eds. La Mirada, 2016), edited by Jesús J. Barquet and Carlota Caulfield. Barquet and Caulfield wrote the introduction to the book ("Mercedes de Acosta en traje de poeta") and, along with Joaquín Badajoz, authored the Spanish translations. In 2017, Imposeida was republished by Ediciones Holguin, in Cuba; and in 2018 an expanded and revised version appeared in bilingual (English/Spanish) format in Ediciones Torremozas, in Madrid.

Composer Joseph Hallman memorialized de Acosta in the song cycle "Raving Beauty" for flute, harp, cello, and soprano. The song cycle was based on the correspondence and ephemera held in the de Acosta collection at the Rosenbach Museum. The work deals with her relationships and correspondences with Greta Garbo, Marlene Dietrich, Isadora Duncan, Igor Stravinsky, and others. Commissioned by the Philadelphia International Festival for the Arts, it has been performed many times, including by the Secret Opera.

See also
 List of Cuban American writers
 List of Famous Cuban-Americans
 List of Lesbian Poets

References

Bibliography and further reading

 de Acosta, Mercedes (2016). Imposeída (46 poemas). Eds. Jesus J. Barquet and Carlota Caulfield. Las Cruces, NM: Eds. La Mirada. .
 de Acosta, Mercedes (2018). Imposeída. Bilingual edition. Eds. Jesus J. Barquet and Carlota Caulfield. Madrid, Ediciones Torremozas .

External links

"Mercedes de Acosta: Playwright, Lesbian Pioneer and Lover to the Stars"
 
 

1892 births
1968 deaths
20th-century American dramatists and playwrights
20th-century American novelists
20th-century American poets
20th-century American women writers
American autobiographers
American women dramatists and playwrights
American women novelists
American women poets
American women's rights activists
American suffragists
American people of Spanish descent
American writers of Cuban descent
Lesbian poets
Lesbian dramatists and playwrights
Lesbian novelists
Lesbian memoirists
American LGBT poets
American LGBT novelists
American LGBT dramatists and playwrights
Writers from New York City
LGBT people from New York (state)
Novelists from New York (state)
American women non-fiction writers
20th-century American non-fiction writers
Women autobiographers
20th-century American LGBT people
American lesbian writers